"Stressed Out" is the second single from A Tribe Called Quest's fourth album Beats, Rhymes and Life. The song was produced by The Ummah and features Faith Evans on the chorus.

Music video
The music video begins with A Tribe Called Quest in a red room. The next scene features a dice game that includes Consequence and Q-Tip. During the game two men begin to fight and as a car pulls up everyone flees. During the chorus, Faith Evans is in blue, red, and black rooms. A restaurant dishwasher is pictured, stressed out at work. A man with money problems is also shown struggling to pay his bills and provide for his family. Then, the dishwasher knocks down all of the dishes and leaves work. When Faith Evans sings, "we gon' make it", the man with money problems and his family are seen throwing a birthday party.

Appearances
The group performed the song on the sitcom Moesha, in the episode titled "A Concerted Effort: Part 1", which aired on November 5, 1996.

Track listing

12" single
A-side
"Stressed Out" (Baby Phife Version - Full)
"Stressed Out" (Raphael Saadiq's Remix)
"Stressed Out" (LP Version)

B-side
"1nce Again" (LP Version)
"1nce Again" (Jay Dee's Instrumental)
"Stressed Out" (Baby Phife Instrumental)

Charts

References

1996 singles
A Tribe Called Quest songs
Faith Evans songs
Jive Records singles
Music videos directed by Hype Williams
1996 songs
Song recordings produced by J Dilla
Song recordings produced by the Ummah
Songs written by Q-Tip (musician)
Songs written by Ali Shaheed Muhammad
Songs written by Phife Dawg
Songs written by J Dilla
Songs written by Faith Evans
Songs written by Consequence (rapper)